State Road 681 (SR 681), also known as the Venice Connector, is a  spur of Interstate 75 (SR 93) near Nokomis, Florida. The road operated as the southern terminus of the expressway in the early 1980s before Interstate 75 extended south to Naples.

Route description
SR 681 begins at an interchange with US 41/SR 45 in Nokomis, heading north as a four-lane freeway. The road passes through developments, coming to a bridge over the Legacy Trail, a rail trail. The freeway heads northeast coming to an at-grade signalized intersection with Honore Avenue. A short distance later, SR 681 merges onto the northbound direction of I-75/SR 93 at an interchange.

History
State Road 681 opened to traffic in 1980 when segments of Interstate 75 between Tampa and Naples were still under construction. At the time, it served as the southern terminus of Interstate 75. An access management plan, coordinated between Florida Department of Transportation (FDOT) and Sarasota County, for SR 681 was adopted in December 2005 to establish access points along the limited-access road, reclassifying the road as a "modified limited access" road. The access management plan established the planned locations of at-grade intersections along SR 681 for future growth adjacent to the highway.

In April 2016, the final phase of Sarasota County's Honore Avenue extension was completed. The project extended Honore Avenue from SR 681 to Laurel Road, providing signalized intersections at both limits. This also made Honore Avenue the first contiguous road to run from Venice north to the Sarasota County line since 1982 when State Road 681 was constructed. Previously, US 41 and I-75 were the only continuous north-south thoroughfares linking Venice and Sarasota.

Major intersections

References

681
681